Edin Velez is a Puerto Rican video artist, director and professor. He is best known for his work on the documentary films State of Rest and Motion and Dance of Darkness.

Life and career
Edin was born and raised in Puerto Rico and is currently based in New York. He studied painting at the University of Puerto Rico and the Institute of Puerto Rican Culture. He moved to the US in the early 1970s and became part of the first generation of video artists working in SoHo, Manhattan. His directorial debut documentary film on Japanese Butoh, Dance of Darkness, was broadcast nationally in the US by PBS. He is a professor and coordinator of the video program at Rutgers University–Newark.

Edin has received numerous award, including American Film Institute's Maya Deren Award, fellowships from the Guggenheim Foundation, the U.S./Japan Friendship Commission, the Jerome Foundation and the New York State Council on the Arts.

Selected exhibitions
Edin's work has been featured in numerous group exhibitions in such institutions as the Whitney Museum of American Art, Centre Georges Pompidou, documenta 8, American Film Institute National Video Festival, Museum of Modern Art and International Center of Photography.

Filmography

References

External links

 

Living people
American video artists
Rutgers University faculty
People from Arecibo, Puerto Rico
Puerto Rican documentary filmmakers
American film directors
University of Puerto Rico alumni
Year of birth missing (living people)